IOA may refer to:

Locations
 Islands of Adventure, a Universal Destinations & Experiences theme park in Orlando, Florida
 Institute of Astronomy, Cambridge
 UCL Institute of Archaeology
 Ioannina National Airport, an airport serving the Greek town of Ioannina

Organizations
 Indian Olympic Association
 Independent Olympic Athletes
 International Olympic Academy
 Institute of Acoustics, Chinese Academy of Sciences
 Institute of Acoustics (United Kingdom), a British engineering society
 International Ombudsman Association
 International Oversight Advisory, a fictional organization in the Stargate franchise
 Irish Orienteering Association

Other
 Input Output Application, a method used to add communicate websites and software, inputting and outputting data.
 Input-output analysis, an economics model
 Information object address, IEC 60870-5-104